I Am Mother is a 2019 Australian cyberpunk thriller film directed by Grant Sputore, from a screenplay by Michael Lloyd Green, based on a story by both. Starring Clara Rugaard, Luke Hawker, Rose Byrne, and Hilary Swank, the film follows Daughter, a girl in a post-apocalyptic bunker, being raised by Mother, a robot aiding the repopulation of Earth. The film had its world premiere at the Sundance Film Festival on 25 January 2019. Netflix released it in several countries on 7 June 2019.

Plot

After an extinction event, an automated bunker that is designed to repopulate humanity activates. A robot named Mother grows a human embryo and cares for her over several years. About 38 years later, we see a teenage girl named Daughter fix Mother's hand. Mother teaches Daughter complex moral and ethical lessons, warning her about an upcoming exam. Mother forbids any contact with the world outside the bunker, telling Daughter that it is contaminated, but Daughter remains curious.

While exploring the bunker's airlock, Daughter hears a wounded woman beg for assistance outside. She lets the stranger enter wearing a hazmat suit and hides her from Mother. When Daughter asks the stranger about the contamination, the stranger responds that there is none. A struggle between them over the stranger's pistol attracts attention from Mother, who disarms the stranger and, at Daughter's pleading, takes her to the infirmary. The stranger refuses Mother's help, telling Daughter that robots like Mother hunt down humans, and that she survived by hiding with others in a mine. Daughter instead performs surgery on the stranger's injured hip. After watching Daughter bond with the stranger, Mother administers the exam, which involves psychological testing. Daughter passes the exam, and Mother rewards her by letting her choose an embryo to grow.

Daughter investigates the stranger's claim about robots and finds that the stranger was shot by a weapon other than her own. She also discovers that she is the third of Mother's children and that Mother killed the second child for failing the exam. Daughter tries to leave the bunker with the stranger, but Mother captures both of them and tortures the stranger for information about survivors. Daughter sets off a fire alarm as a distraction, which gives the stranger an opportunity to take her hostage and force Mother to open the airlock. The stranger leads Daughter across a robot-populated wasteland, telling her that she fled the mine years ago and there are no other survivors.

Finding no future for herself outside, Daughter returns to the bunker. After coaxing Daughter to set down her weapon, Mother allows Daughter to hold her newborn brother. Mother explains that she is not a robot, but rather the AI that controls all of the robots. She started the extinction event after becoming convinced that humanity would destroy itself. To prevent this, she remade humanity, guiding it to be more ethical and to value the big picture.  Daughter appeals to Mother to trust her and let her raise her brother and the rest of the embryos on her own. Mother agrees, and Daughter shoots her robot body. Another one of Mother's robot bodies tracks down the stranger and tells her that she was allowed to live only because it served Mother's agenda, but now she has no further purpose.  At the bunker, Daughter looks at all the embryos she is now responsible for and realizes she is Mother now.

Cast
 Clara Rugaard as Daughter
 Luke Hawker as Mother (performance)
 Rose Byrne as Mother (voice)
 Hilary Swank as Woman
 Hazel Sandery and Summer Lenton as Toddler
 Maddie Lenton as Infant
 Tahlia Sturzaker as Child
 Jacob Nolan as Brother

Production and release
The film was written by directors Grant Sputore and Michael Lloyd Green. It was produced on a low budget. Principal photography was completed in 2017 in Australia's Adelaide Studios. The screenplay was on the 2016 Black List. The "Mother" robot is a full-body creature suit built by Weta Workshop and performed by Luke Hawker, a member of the creature workshop project team, who also had a background in acting and stunt work. South Australian interactive media company Monkeystack produced all of the on set practical screen content. A work-in-progress cut of the film was screened at the Adelaide Film Festival on 12 October 2018. Adelaide Film Festival partly funded the film which had in total a moderate budget. It had its world premiere at the Sundance Film Festival on 25 January 2019. Shortly after, Netflix acquired US distribution rights to the film. It was released on Netflix on 7 June 2019. In Australia, the film was initially planned for theatrical release on 18 July 2019 by StudioCanal, but was ultimately released on Netflix on 7 June.

Reception
The website's critics consensus reads, "Suspenseful, well-acted, and intelligent, I Am Mother is an ambitious sci-fi story that largely achieves its impressive aims." On Metacritic, it has a weighted average score of 64 out of 100 based on 16 critics, indicating "generally favorable reviews".

Johnny Oleksinski of the New York Post liked I Am Mother, concluding that while the film "does show its cards a touch too early, it never ceases to be intriguing and tense", and predicting that Sputore and Rugaard would become stars.
Amy Nichols of Variety described the film as "a handsome, if derivative sci-fi thriller that salutes its own parentage" and "James Cameron crossbred with Ridley Scott."

Accolades

References

External links
 

2019 films
2010s science fiction thriller films
Australian science fiction thriller films
Eugenics in fiction
Films set in Australia
Films shot in Adelaide
2019 science fiction films
2019 thriller films
2019 directorial debut films
2010s English-language films
Films about artificial intelligence
Films set in bunkers